Mohammed Rafique, born 5 September 1970 was a Bangladeshi cricket coach and former cricketer. He was the first Bangladeshi bowler to take 100 wickets in Test matches.

Rafique is known his contribution to the cricket world with positions in both the World XI for the Super Series against Australia in 2005 and the Asia XI for the exhibition series against Africa XI in 2007. He was named captain of Bangladesh Legends cricket team in 2020-21 Road Safety World Series. On 20 January 2022, Rafique joined Asia Lions along with Habibul Bashar in Legends League Cricket, where he took 2 wickets against India Maharajas.

Domestic career
He started his career as a left arm seamer with the 2nd Division side, Bangladesh Sporting, in 1985. In 1988, he joined Bangladesh Biman cricket team. There, under the influence of the Pakistani allrounder Wasim Haider he converted to slow orthodox spin bowling.

In December 1994, he played for the Bangladesh team in the 2nd SAARC cricket tournament where he had a 3/25 in the Bangladesh win against India "A".

He was a member of the Bangladesh team that won the 1997 ICC Trophy. Overall, in 9 matches, he took 19 wickets at an average of 10.68. His best 4/25 came in the semi-final against Scotland. With his spinning partner Enamul Haque Moni taking 12 wickets in the tournament. In the final against Kenya he had scored valuable 26 of 15 deliveries.

Rafique was banned—with 13 professional players—for ten years from all forms of cricket by the Bangladesh Cricket Board following his enrolment in the Indian Cricket League (ICL) in August 2008, but renounced his ties with the ICL a year later and has since been accepted back into the fold. He is still playing first-class cricket for Dhaka Division and recently starred in the Big Boss T20 Premier League with a match-winning performance for Abahani Limited in the final.

International career
A slow-left-arm orthodox bowler, Rafique was one of the few Bangladeshi players in the ICC bowler rankings' top fifty. He became a permanent fixture in the national team, and was a household name in Bangladesh. He achieved the double of 100 wickets and 1000 runs in both formats.

One of the most senior players in the Bangladesh team, Rafique was better known for his abilities in ODIs early in his career. He was nevertheless selected to play in Bangladesh's inaugural Test against India, and showed his promise with three wickets.

His career was almost derailed soon afterwards, when he was reported to the ICC for a suspect action. He was tardy in taking remedial action, and was out of the national team until 2002, when he was picked for the home series against South Africa. His return to cricket was promising, with a six-wicket haul in the second Test against South Africa. He was the highest wicket-taker for Bangladesh in the home Test series against India, and the second highest during the away tour to Zimbabwe.

Rafique is also known as a handy, hard-hitting lower-order batsman. His 77 versus Kenya in May 1998 at Hyderabad was instrumental in Bangladesh's first ever ODI win against Kenya. With the ball, he took 3/56, and was adjudged the man of the match. He also scored a Test century against the West Indies in Bangladesh's drawn Test. Also he scored 65 against Australia in 2005–6, including six sixes.

He was instrumental in steering Bangladesh to a series whitewash against the Kenyans, and recorded his best match figures in Tests against Australia in a match they only narrowly lost. Rafique had a successful 2007 World Cup, taking eight wickets and helping Bangladesh to win games against India and South Africa.

Rafique announced his international retirement on 7 February 2008. Bangladesh's home series against South Africa was his last for the national team. He became the first Bangladeshi to ever take the milestone of 100 test wickets by having Robin Peterson caught at first slip by Junaid Siddique on 1 March during the second test. Out of 53 players who have scored 1,000 runs and taken 100 wickets in Test cricket, Rafique was the first to have represented Bangladesh.

References

External links
 

1970 births
Living people
Bangladesh One Day International cricketers
Bangladeshi cricketers
Bangladesh Test cricketers
Bangladesh Twenty20 International cricketers
20th-century Bangladeshi cricketers
21st-century Bangladeshi cricketers
ACC Asian XI One Day International cricketers
Sylhet Division cricketers
Dhaka Division cricketers
Cricketers at the 1998 Commonwealth Games
Cricketers at the 1999 Cricket World Cup
Cricketers at the 2003 Cricket World Cup
Bangladeshi cricket coaches
ICL Bangladesh XI cricketers
Dhaka Warriors cricketers
Abahani Limited cricketers
Mohammedan Sporting Club cricketers
Partex Sporting Club cricketers
Recipients of the Bangladesh National Sports Award
Commonwealth Games competitors for Bangladesh
Cricketers from Dhaka